José Manuel Moreno Periñán (born 7 May 1969) is a Spanish former cyclist and Olympic Champion. Moreno won the gold medal at the 1992 Olympic Games in Barcelona, for the Men's 1.000m Time Trial.

References

External links

1969 births
Living people
Cyclists at the 1988 Summer Olympics
Cyclists at the 1992 Summer Olympics
Cyclists at the 1996 Summer Olympics
Olympic gold medalists for Spain
Spanish male cyclists
Olympic cyclists of Spain
Olympic medalists in cycling
Cyclists from Amsterdam
Medalists at the 1992 Summer Olympics
Spanish track cyclists
People from Chiclana de la Frontera
Sportspeople from the Province of Cádiz
Dutch people of Spanish descent
Dutch emigrants to Spain
Cyclists from Andalusia